Nathan Arnett (born December 15, 1990) is a male hurdler from Nassau, Bahamas, who mainly competes in the 400m Hurdles and 110m Hurdles. He attended St. Augustine's College in Nassau, Bahamas, before going on to compete for  Iowa Central Community College and Mississippi State University.

Personal bests

References

External links
 World Athletics Bio
 Mississippi State Bio

1990 births
Living people
Bahamian male sprinters
Bahamian male hurdlers
People from Nassau, Bahamas
Junior college men's track and field athletes in the United States
Mississippi State University alumni
Iowa Central Community College alumni